The Master of the Estate (German: Der Majoratsherr) is a 1943 German drama film directed by Hans Deppe and starring Willy Birgel, Viktoria von Ballasko and Anneliese Uhlig. Location shooting took place in Pomerania, Mecklenburg and Ramsau in the Bavarian Alps. The film's sets were designed by the art directors Otto Gülstorff and Carl Ludwig Kirmse. It is based on the 1895 Swedish novel Der Majoratsherr von Halleborg by Alfred von Hedenstjerna.

Cast
 Willy Birgel as Bernhard von Halleborg
 Viktoria von Ballasko as 	Amelie von Linden
 Anneliese Uhlig as 	Julia Dahl
 Ernst Sattler as von Linden, Amelies Vater
 Heddo Schulenburg as 	Kurt, ihr Bruder
 Doris Holve as 	Christa, ihre Schwester 
 Arthur Schröder as 	Dr. Osterkamp
 Harry Liedtke as 	Dr. Stempel
 Werner Scharf as 	Oskar von Halleborg
 Maria Locatelli as 	Cilli, seine Frau
 Knut Hartwig as Plate, Gutsinspektor
 Hedwig Wangel as Malena, Wirtschafterin
 Erwin Biegel as 	Karl, Diener
 Ernst Karchow as 	Professor Lindroth

References

Bibliography
 Kreimeier, Klaus. The Ufa Story: A History of Germany's Greatest Film Company, 1918-1945. University of California Press, 1999.
 Rentschler, Eric. The Ministry of Illusion: Nazi Cinema and Its Afterlife. Harvard University Press, 1996.

External links 
 

1943 films
Films of Nazi Germany
German drama films
1943 drama films
1940s German-language films
German black-and-white films
1940s German films
Films directed by Hans Deppe
UFA GmbH films
Films shot in Bavaria
Films based on Swedish novels

de:Der Majoratsherr